The Union Monument in Perryville is an historic monument located by the visitor center of the Perryville Battlefield State Historic Site, in the vicinity of Perryville, Kentucky, in Boyle County, Kentucky.  It was built in 1928, sixty-six years after the Battle of Perryville, the bloodiest battle in Kentucky history, on October 8, 1862.  There were 16,000 Union soldiers at the Battle of Perryville, with 4,276 combined killed, captured, wounded, and missing.

The monument was created by a decree of the United States Congress on March 3, 1928.  It is a granite obelisk, eighteen feet tall, and is one of only seven monuments to the war in Kentucky that honored the Union cause; the vast majority honored the Confederate States of America.  Inscriptions are placed on the north and south sides of the monument. All but one Union monument in Kentucky was erected by the Federal Government or private funds.  The monument at Vanceburg, Kentucky is the only Union structure in Kentucky erected by public submission.

On July 17, 1997, the Union Monument in Perryville was one of sixty different monuments related to the Civil War in Kentucky placed on the National Register of Historic Places, as part of the Civil War Monuments of Kentucky Multiple Property Submission. Three other monuments on this Multiple Property Submission are also in Boyle County.  One of them, the Confederate Monument in Perryville, stands between the Union Monument and the visitor center of the Perryville Battlefield State Historic Site, a few yards away.  The Unknown Confederate Dead Monument in Perryville is a mile away on private land at the Goodknight Cemetery.  Like the Union monument, it was built in 1928, much later than the 1902 construction of the Confederate Monument.   The other is in downtown Danville, Kentucky: the Confederate Monument in Danville.

Gallery

References

Civil War Monuments of Kentucky MPS
National Register of Historic Places in Boyle County, Kentucky
1928 sculptures
Obelisks in the United States
1928 establishments in Kentucky
Union (American Civil War) monuments and memorials in Kentucky